Bowler may refer to:

Places

United States
 Bowler Hill, Missouri
 Bowler, Montana
 Bowler, Virginia
 Bowler, Wisconsin

Other places
 Bowler Rocks, a group of rocks off the north coast of Greenwich Island, Antarctica

Sports
 Bowler (cricket), a cricketer who delivers the ball to an opposing batsman
 Bowler (ten-pin), someone participating in the sport of bowling

Other
 Bowler hat, a hard felt hat with a rounded crown
 Bowler (surname), an English surname
 Bowler (TV series), a 1973 British television series and spin off of The Fenn Street Gang
 Bowler Communications System, a protocol for controlling CNC machines
 Bowler Offroad, a maker of offroad vehicles
 Bowler, in marbles, a ⅞ inch (22mm) marble
 James "Lord Bowler" Lonefeather, a fictional character in The Adventures of Brisco County, Jr.
 Bowler, a creature featured in Dungeons & Dragons
 Bowler, a troop featured in Clash of Clans and Clash Royale

See also
 Bowl (disambiguation)
 Bowling (disambiguation)
 John Bowler (disambiguation)
 Peter Bowler (disambiguation)
 Thomas Bowler (disambiguation)